Khalifa bin Zayed Stadium is a multi-purpose stadium in Al Ain, the United Arab Emirates.

History 

One of the prominent events to be staged on this stadium was the Group E matches of the 2003 FIFA World Youth Championship and the stadium also hosted some matches from the 1996 AFC Asian Cup.

The stadium is used mostly for football matches, and is one of the home grounds of Al Ain FC. The stadium underwent a renovation in 2002 and increased its capacity to 12,000 people and as of the 2006/2007 season all the Al Ain team matches are played in this stadium. The stadium went through another significant upgrade and renovation, to prepare for the 2019 AFC Asian Cup, hosted in the UAE.

2019 AFC Asian Cup 
Sheikh Khalifa International Stadium hosted six games of the 2019 AFC Asian Cup, including a Round of 16 match.

References

External links 
 Sheikh Khalifa International Stadium
 Stadium images

Football venues in the United Arab Emirates
Multi-purpose stadiums in the United Arab Emirates
Sports venues in the Emirate of Abu Dhabi
Al Ain FC
Buildings and structures in Al Ain
Tourist attractions in Al Ain